The 1988 Delaware gubernatorial election took place on November 8, 1988. Incumbent Republican Governor Mike Castle won re-election to a second term, defeating Democratic nominee labor lawyer Jacob Kreshtool in a landslide. Both were unopposed in their respective primaries. , this was the last time a Republican was elected Governor of Delaware.

General election

Candidates
Michael Castle (R), incumbent governor
 Jacob Kreshtool (D), labor lawyer

Results

References

1988
Gubernatorial
1988 United States gubernatorial elections